Live Sentence (1984) is the only live album released by the American heavy metal band Alcatrazz featuring the band's original line-up. The live concert recorded for the album was performed on 28 January 1984 at Nakano Sun Plaza in Tokyo. In addition to tracks from Alcatrazz's debut album, No Parole from Rock 'n" Roll, the album includes performances by Alcatrazz of songs from the Rainbow album Down to Earth recorded and released when Graham Bonnet, Alcatrazz's singer and primary lyricist, was the lead singer of Rainbow. According to Billboard, the album spent 16 weeks on the chart and peaked at No. 133.

Track listings

The song "Kree Nakoorie" was edited down to 6:52 for the album release, the song actually ran 11:13 long at the show. On the album the song ends when the crowd cheers, but at the concert there was an additional 4:21 guitar solo ending with Yngwie J. Malmsteen making his guitar sound like a spaceship taking off. This extended version of the song can be found on various bootleg recordings.
The bonus tracks are from the same concert and comprise the entire unabridged concert.

No Parole from Rock 'n' Roll Tour Live in Japan 1984.1.28 Audio Tracks (2010 Reissue) 

"Too Young to Die, Too Drunk to Live"
"Hiroshima Mon Amour"
"Night Games"
"Big Foot"
"Island in the Sun"
"Kree Nakoorie"
"Since You've Been Gone"
"Suffer Me"
"Desert Song"
"Evil Eye"
"All Night Long"
"Lost in Hollywood"
"Koujou No Tsuki"
"Something Else"

2016 Remastered Version
CD
"Too Young to Die, Too Drunk to Live" - 4:52
"Hiroshima Mon Amour" - 4:12
"Night Games" - 3:01
"Big Foot" - 4:12
"Island in the Sun" - 4:09
"Kree Nakoorie" - 7:35
"Coming Bach" - 3:20
"Since You've Been Gone" - 3:32
"Suffer Me" - 4:52
"Desert Song" - 5:14
"Evil Eye" - 5:05
"Guitar Crash" - 4:37
"All Night Long" - 7:08
"Lost in Hollywood" - 5:25
"Koujou No Tsuki" - 1:37
"Something Else" - 3:10

DVD
Live at Nakano Sunplaza, Tokyo, January 28, 1984
"Too Young to Die, Too Drunk to Live"
"Hiroshima Mon Amour"
"Night Games"
"Big Foot"
"Island in the Sun"
"Kree Nakoorie"
"Coming Bach"
"Since You Been Gone"
"Suffer Me"
"Desert Song"
"Evil Eye"
"Guitar Crash"
"All Night Long"
"Lost in Hollywood"
"Koujou No Tsuki"
"Something Else"
Rock Palace USA
"Too Young to Die, Too Drunk to Live"
"Hiroshima Mon Amour"
"Island in the Sun"

Live In Japan 1984 Complete Edition (2018 Reissue)

CD 1 

 Opening 
 Too Young To Die, Too Drunk To Live 
 Hiroshima Mon Amour 
 Night Games 
 Big Foot 
 Island In The Sun 
 Kree Nakoorie 
 Coming Bach 
 Since You Been Gone 
 Suffer Me

CD2 

 Desert Song 
 Jet To Jet 
 Evil Eye 
 Guitar Crush 
 All Night Long 
 Lost In Hollywood 
 Kojo No Tsuki 
 Something Else

DVD / BD 

 Opening 
 Too Young To Die, Too Drunk To Live 
 Hiroshima Mon Amour 
 Night Games 
 Big Foot 
 Island In The Sun 
 Kree Nakoorie 
 Coming Bach 
 Since You Been Gone 
 Suffer Me 
 Desert Song 
 Jet To Jet 
 Evil Eye 
 Guitar Crush 
 All Night Long 
 Lost In Hollywood 
 Kojo No Tsuki 
 Something Else

Personnel
Alcatrazz
 Graham Bonnet – vocals, acoustic guitar on "Something Else"
 Yngwie Malmsteen – guitar
 Jimmy Waldo – keyboards, backing vocals, guitar on "Something Else"
 Gary Shea – bass
 Jan Uvena – drums, backing vocals

Production
Andrew Trueman – producer
Lester Claypool – producer, remixing at Rochshire Studios, Anaheim, California
Jeffrey Karlson, Kanae Yokota – live recording engineers
Jimmy Isaacs – guitar technician
Linda Henman – remixing assistant
 Peter Vargo – remixing assistant
Bad Samuels – art direction
Jake Duncan – tour manager
Andrew Trueman for De Novo Music Group – management

References

1984 live albums
Polydor Records live albums
Alcatrazz albums
Albums recorded at Nakano Sun Plaza